Alan Timberlake (born in 1946) is a linguist, a professor in the Department of Slavic Languages and Literatures at Columbia University and the director of the East Central European Center.

Education 
Alan Timberlake received a Ph.D from Harvard University in 1973.

Academic career 

Alan Timberlake taught for 14 years at UCLA, then for 21 years at the University of California at Berkeley. In 2008, he came to Columbian University. He served as chair at these three universities for 12 years in total. He also has taught courses in philology at Stanford as a visitor.

Research interest  
The focus of Timberlake's research is language. At Columbia University, he teaches courses on Slavic cultures and Russian linguistics. Apart from that, he teaches several courses a year in general linguistics, including recently “Language and Society”, which included a discussion of language allegiance among diasporic communities in America.

Timberlake speaks Czech and Russian and reads other Slavic languages and Lithuanian

Selected works

Books

Articles 
 
 Timberlake, Alan. 1993. Isochrony in Late Common Slavic. In Robert A. Maquire and Alan Timberlake (eds.), American Contributions to the Eleventh International Congress of Slavists. Literature. Linguistics. Poetics. Columbus, OH: Slavica.
 Timberlake, Alan. 1993. Russian. In Bernard Comrie and Greville Corbett (eds.), The Slavonic Languages, London-New York: Routledge.
 
 Timberlake, Alan. 2000. Older and Younger Recensions of the First Novgorod Chronicle, Oxford Slavonic Papers, 33:135.

Festschrift 
Vladislava Warditz (ed.): Russian Grammar: System – Usus – Variation (= Linguistica Philologica 1), Peter Lang Verlag, Berlin et al. 2021.

The present volume contains a selection of papers presented at the Fifth International Symposium on Russian Grammar: System–Usus–Language Variation, which took place from September 22 to 24, 2021, at the University of Potsdam (Potsdam, Germany). This collection of essays is dedicated to Alan Timberlake, on the occasion of his 75th birthday.

References

External links
Alan Timberlake on the website of Columbia University
Alan Timberlake on the website of the European Institute
Alan Timberlake on the website of University of California, Berkeley

1946 births
Living people
University of California, Berkeley faculty
University of California, Los Angeles faculty
Columbia University faculty
Harvard University alumni